Mueang Trat is the capital district (amphoe mueang) of Trat province, eastern Thailand.

History
The area was settled in 1901 as a khwaeng of Mueang Trat. The government upgraded the khwaeng to Mueang Trat District in 1908. In 1921 the district was renamed Bang Phra after the name of the central tambon. The district name was changed to Mueang Trat in 1938 due to a new naming policy for capital districts.

Geography
Neighboring districts are (from the west clockwise): Laem Ngop, Khao Saming, and Bo Rai of Trat Province; Pursat and Koh Kong Provinces of Cambodia; Khlong Yai of Trat Province; and the Gulf of Thailand.

The district has one border crossing into Cambodia, at Ban Tha Sen. It is a "temporary" crossing, open only several days a week.  there are plans to construct a permanent border crossing.

Administration
The district is divided into 14 sub-districts (tambons), which are further subdivided into 97 villages (mubans). Trat itself has town (thesaban mueang) status and covers the tambon Bang Phra and part of Wang Krachae. The township (thesaban tambon) Tha Phrik Noen Sai covers the complete tambon Tha Phrik and parts of Noen Sai. There are a further 12 tambon administrative organizations (TAO).

References

Further reading

External links

amphoe.com

Mueang Trat